Val d'Erdre-Auxence is a commune in the Maine-et-Loire department of western France. The municipality was established on 15 December 2016 and consists of the former communes of La Cornuaille, Le Louroux-Béconnais and Villemoisan.

See also 
Communes of the Maine-et-Loire department

References 

Communes of Maine-et-Loire